Patrick Green (born September 23, 1964) is a former member of the Michigan House of Representatives.

Early life
Green was born on September 23, 1964 in Royal Oak, Michigan.

Education
Green studied mathematics at the University of Detroit.

Career
Green was an employee of Wells Fargo Insurance from 1996 to 2006. Green served on the Warren city council from 2007 to 2016. On November 8, 2016, Green was elected to the Michigan House of Representatives where he represented the 28th district from November 22, 2016 to December 31, 2018. When seeking re-election, Green was defeated in the Democratic primary by Lori Stone on August 7, 2018, who would go on to be elected to the state house.

Personal life
Green is married to Pilar Ferry. Together they had six children.

References

Living people
1964 births
People from Royal Oak, Michigan
People from Warren, Michigan
Democratic Party members of the Michigan House of Representatives
Michigan city council members
21st-century American politicians
University of Detroit Mercy alumni